Ajinohur or Acinohur Lake is a lake in the Shaki rayon of Azerbaijan.

References

Lakes of Azerbaijan